Sociedad Deportiva Colloto is a football team based in Colloto, a place between Siero and Oviedo, in the autonomous community of Asturias. The team plays in Primera Regional. The club's home ground is El Nora, which has a capacity of 2,000 spectators.

History
Colloto was founded as a merger of three teams:
Colloto CF
Águila Negra
CD Central Lechera

Season to season

11 seasons in Tercera División

External links
Official website 
Futbolme.com profile 

Football clubs in Asturias
Association football clubs established in 1987
Divisiones Regionales de Fútbol clubs
1987 establishments in Spain